NA-133 may refer to:

 NA-133 (Lahore-XI), a constituency for the National Assembly of Pakistan
 NA-133 (Sheikhupura-III), a former constituency for the National Assembly of Pakistan
 NA-133, company designation of a proposed naval variant of the North American P-51 Mustang

National Assembly Constituencies of Pakistan